Sorrell and Son is a 1934 British drama film directed by Jack Raymond and written by Lydia Hayward. The film stars H. B. Warner, Margot Grahame, Peter Penrose, Hugh Williams and Winifred Shotter. It was made by the producer Herbert Wilcox at British and Dominion Elstree Studios. It is based on the 1925 novel of the same title by Warwick Deeping. A silent version had previously been released in 1927, also starring Warner.

The film was released on 29 May 1934, by United Artists. It was actor Louis Hayward's final English film before relocating to America, where he had a successful acting career for many years.

Plot
 When Captain Sorrell returns home from the war, his wife Dora leaves him for another man. Despite considerable hardship, the captain devotes his life to bringing up his young son Kit, who becomes the object of his devotion. Eventually, the boy grows up to have a successful career as a doctor, and the captain lives long enough to see him happily married.

Cast 
H. B. Warner as Captain Stephen Sorrell
Margot Grahame as Mrs. Dora Sorrell
Peter Penrose as Kit Sorrell as a Child
Hugh Williams as Kit Sorrell as an Adult
Winifred Shotter as Molly Pentreath
Ruby Miller as Mrs. Palfrey
Evelyn Roberts as Mr. Roland
Donald Calthrop as Dr. Richard Orange
Arthur Chesney as Mr. Porteous
Wally Patch as Buck
Hope Davy as Ethel
Louis Hayward as Duncan

Critical reception
The New York Times wrote "Warwick Deeping's novel, Sorrell and Son, which was produced as a silent film about seven years ago, is now to be seen at the Mayfair in talking-picture form. It was made by the British and Dominions concern under the supervision of Herbert Wilcox. It gives a faithful transcription...but in an episodic fashion, which often causes the story to be somewhat abrupt in its development. H.B. Warner, who acted Captain Sorrell in the mute edition, again plays the rôle in the current offering; and if his acting is not always as restrained as one might wish, it is frequently affecting. And after all, the author himself piled on the agony, a fact which gives both Mr. Warner and Mr. Wilcox an excuse to overemphasize the depiction of the hardships and misfortunes of the ex-British officer. Although there were disappointing spots in the Brenon film, its continuity was infinitely better than the present work, and also the silent production had the advantage of many impressive glimpses of London, the upper reaches of the Thames and the English countryside. Admitting that Mr. Wilcox gives an occasional flash of a charming country town, there are not enough of such views...The tragic note in the end is touched upon with laudable reticence";. TV Guide noted "Warner is nearly perfect in his portrayal of the broken man who refuses to give in, although choppy editing hinders the overall effect."

References

External links 
 

1934 films
British black-and-white films
Films directed by Jack Raymond
United Artists films
1934 drama films
British drama films
Films based on British novels
British and Dominions Studios films
Films shot at Imperial Studios, Elstree
1930s English-language films
1930s British films